Lourdata is a village on the south coast of Cephalonia, Greece. It is part of the municipal unit Leivatho.

Populated places in Cephalonia